Nigerian National Honours are a set of orders and decorations conferred upon Nigerians and friends of Nigeria every year. They were instituted by the National Honors Act No. 5 of 1964, during the First Nigerian Republic, to honour Nigerians who have rendered service to the benefit of the nation.

These honours are distinct from the honours that are part of the country's ancient chieftaincy system, which is a separate (but also legally defined) entity. National Honours are the highest honours or awards that a citizen can receive from his or her country for service to the country.

Introduction 
Service to country is when one has done something very good for the country or that makes the country proud. For example, a citizen may receive a national honour for inventing something useful to other citizens, for performing well in an important job, or for writing a brilliant book.

The Nigerian government decides which citizens get honours. Everyone may not always agree on who deserves national honours. Sometimes the person receiving the honour may decide that he or she does not want it. In 2004, the famous Nigerian author, Chinua Achebe, was awarded a national honour by the Nigerian government but rejected it because he was disappointed with the way the government was ruling Nigeria at the time.

Honours 

The Nigerian National Honours, in descending order of importance, are:

Order of the Federal Republic 
 Grand Commander of the Order of the Federal Republic (GCFR)
 Commander of the Order of the Federal Republic (CFR)
 Officer of the Order of the Federal Republic (OFR)
 Member of the Order of the Federal Republic (MFR)

Order of the Niger 
 Grand Commander of the Order of the Niger (GCON)
 Commander of the Order of the Niger (CON)
 Officer of the Order of the Niger (OON)
 Member of the Order of the Niger (MON)

The GCFR and GCON are customarily respectively bestowed on former occupants of the office of President of Nigeria and Vice President of Nigeria including former military heads of state of Nigeria and Chiefs of General Staff. The GCON is also customarily bestowed on the Chief Justice of Nigeria and the President of the Nigerian Senate during their first year in office, while the CON is customarily bestowed on Justices of the Supreme Court of Nigeria

Medals

 Forces Service Star (FSS)
 Grand Service Star (GSS)
 Distinguished Service Star (DSS)
 Meritorious Service Star (MSS)
 Command Medal of Honour (CMH)
 Command Medal (CM)

References

External links

 Orders, Decorations and Medals of the Republic of Nigeria - Ribbon Chart
 Nigeria National Merit Award - Presidency of Nigeria. Retrieved 18 August 2016.
 Worlds awards
 Nigeria: National Honours Awards 2010 and 2011, Economic Confidential.  Retrieved 18 August 2016.

Nigeria and the Commonwealth of Nations
 
Nigerian awards
National symbols of Nigeria